This article features the 2003 UEFA European Under-19 Championship second qualifying round. Seven group winners qualified for the main tournament in Liechtenstein.

Teams
The following teams qualified for this round:

11 group winners from the first qualifying round.

 
 
 
 
 
 
 
 
 
 
 

11 group runners-up from the first qualifying round

 
 
 
 
 
 
 
  (as FR Yugoslavia in previous round)
 
 
 

6 teams received a bye for the first qualifying round

Group 1
All matches were played in Germany.

Group 2
All matches were played in France.

Group 3
All matches were played in Portugal.

Group 4
All matches were played in Ireland.

Group 5
All matches were played in Austria. Serbia and Montenegro participated as FR Yugoslavia in the first qualifying round.

Group 6
All matches were played in Hungary.

Group 7
All matches were played in Italy.

See also
 2003 UEFA European Under-19 Championship
 2003 UEFA European Under-19 Championship first qualifying round

External links
Results by RSSSF

2
UEFA European Under-19 Championship qualification